Jeff Duncan (born 28 January 1966) is an American heavy metal guitarist, best known for being a member of Armored Saint and previously Odin. He currently also plays in DC4.

Biography

Duncan got his start in the Los Angeles-based band Odin alongside brother Shawn Duncan on drums. The band self-released the three-song EP Caution! in 1983, followed by the six-song mini-LP, Don't Take No for an Answer, on the local Half-Wet label in 1985. A promotional video was shot for the song "Shining Love."  Odin would sign a deal with RCA/Victor for the Japan only release of their 1987 full-length debut, Fight For Your Life. The band infamously appeared in the 1988 documentary, The Decline of Western Civilization Part II: The Metal Years, and issued another six-song mini-LP, The Gods Must Be Crazy, that same year before breaking up. Duncan would contribute lead guitar on the 1990 Lost and Found album by Lostboys, a new band fronted by former Odin vocalist Randy O. He also appeared in the promotional video for the song "Cryin' Out."

In 1989, Duncan joined Armored Saint and made his recording debut on 1991's Symbol of Salvation, co-writing several songs, including the MTV video/single, "Last Train Home."  Duncan remains a member to this day and has been part of every subsequent Armored Saint release.

When Armored Saint temporarily broke up after vocalist John Bush accepted an offer to join Anthrax in 1992, Duncan formed the band Bird of Prey which also featured former Ravage vocalist Kyle Michaels, bassist Paul Puljiz (ex-Stone Soldier), and Shawn Duncan on drums.  They recorded the L·T·D (Live to DAT) 8-song cassette in 1993, which received distribution in Germany. The band recorded another five-song demo, with Matt Duncan replacing Puljiz on bass, before eventually morphing into DC4 (DC = Duncan Clan) whose initial line-up comprised all three Duncan brothers, with Jeff now handling lead vocal and guitar duties, and former Grave Danger guitarist, Hyland Church.  They debuted in 1995 with the self-released Mood Swings EP.  The current DC4 is composed of Jeff, Shawn and Matt Duncan and former Dio and Violets Demise guitarist, Rowan Robertson.

In addition, Duncan plays guitar for the Dizzy Reed Band, and Dizzy Reed has played keyboards for DC4.

Duncan also plays in and around Las Vegas, where he currently resides, and occasionally makes appearances in the Vegas Valley at Sin City Sinners shows. He is currently playing shows with Armored Saint, DC4, and the Las-Vegas based band, The Bones, featuring Sean Koos (ex-Joan Jett & The Blackhearts), Patrick Vitagliano (ex-John Connelly's Nuclear Theory), and brother Shawn Duncan.  At one point he was also in a band called The Thornbirds, which also included Russ Parrish and Darren Leader from Steel Panther as well as bass player Dean Cameron.

Duncan and Odin would reunite for the first time in 2003 and have performed live as recently as 2018 in conjunction with the re-release of Don't Take No for an Answer and Fight For Your Life on Dave Ellefson's EMP label.

Duncan's first solo album, Wanderlust, saw a digital release in late 2019 by Warrant's Erik Turner and Jerry Dixon on their Downboys label. A CD version of the album was set for April 2020 through EMP, with a limited edition vinyl release scheduled for July.

Albums

References

External links
Armored Saint on Facebook
DC4 on Facebook
Odin on Facebook

1966 births
20th-century American guitarists
20th-century American male musicians
American heavy metal guitarists
American male guitarists
Armored Saint members
Living people
Rhythm guitarists